Michael Knowles (born ) is a professional rugby league footballer who plays as a  for the Hunslet RLFC in the Betfred League 1. 

Knowles has one first-grade honour to his name from when he played for Castleford (Heritage № 833). He played in round 25 of 2006's Super League XI, here he came off the bench in a 48-10 loss away to Bradford.
After being released by Featherstone he signed for Dewsbury in July 2017 on a deal lasting until the end of the 2018 season.

References

1987 births
Living people
Barrow Raiders players
Castleford Tigers players
Dewsbury Rams players
English rugby league players
Featherstone Rovers players
Hunslet R.L.F.C. players
Newcastle Thunder players
Rugby league second-rows
Rugby league locks
Rugby league props
Sheffield Eagles players